Mikado is named after the ancient title of the Emperor of Japan.  Is a hamlet in the Canadian province of Saskatchewan. The hamlet is part of the rural municipality of Sliding Hills No. 273. It  has a flag stop for Via Rail's Winnipeg-Churchill train.

Mikado is located at the intersection of Highway 5 and Highway 754.

This village was founded after the Japanese had won several victories in the war against Russia (Russo-Japanese War 1904–05). Britain was allied with Japan in this war and Japan was a very popular nation throughout the British Empire. Three towns in Saskatchewan along the CN line (Togo, Kuroki, Mikado), a regional park (Oyama), and CN Siding (Fukushiama) were named in honour of Japanese achievements in this war.

Demographics 

References 

Designated places in Saskatchewan
Hamlets in Saskatchewan
Sliding Hills No. 273, Saskatchewan
Division No. 9, Saskatchewan